Günther Serres (June 18, 1910 – December 26, 1981) was a German politician of the Christian Democratic Union (CDU) and former member of the German Bundestag.

Life 
He was a member of the German Bundestag from its first election in 1949 to 1969. He represented the constituency of Krefeld in parliament as a directly elected member of parliament.

Literature

References

1910 births
1981 deaths
Members of the Bundestag for North Rhine-Westphalia
Members of the Bundestag 1965–1969
Members of the Bundestag 1961–1965
Members of the Bundestag 1957–1961
Members of the Bundestag 1953–1957
Members of the Bundestag 1949–1953
Members of the Bundestag for the Christian Democratic Union of Germany